Medea Japaridze (20 February 1923, in Tbilisi – 31 March 1994) was a Soviet and Georgian actress. People's Artist of the Georgian SSR.

Life 
In 1939, she graduated from Tbilisi VIII secondary school. She worked for two years at the Folk Art Theater at Nadzaladevi. From 1942 till the end of her life, she was an actress at the Kote Marjanishvili Academic Theater. In the studio of the Rustaveli Theater she listened to Giorgi Tosvonogov's lecture course. Later she was sent to Vol. Nemirovich-Danchenko Studios ub Moscow,. Here she was directed by Zaraksky who invited her to the Mossovite Theater, where she played the role of Cleopatra in the Russian language by "Caesar and Cleopatra". She soon returned to her homeland and spent all her life in Georgian cinema.

At the Kote Marjanishvili theater  history of the Georgian theater. Among them is Nina (Mikhail Lermontov's "masquerade"), Julieta, Beatricech, Lady Ana (William Shakespeare's Romeo and Juliet), "Wounded Wife Murden", "Richard III"), drunken (M. Baratashvili' Marine '), (Vazhava Pshavela's "Cut"), Marta (Cassona's trees are overly loud), Varvara Karupovna (Kita Buchaidze's "Aavle's Dog"), Gulkani (P. Kakabadze's "Kakhaber Sword"), St (Sophocles "Oedipo King"), Mother (Lasha Tabukashvili's Old Waltz) and others.

In 1950, the role of "Juragi Shield" she was awarded a Stalin prize for the role. The same year he was awarded the title of the People's Artist of the Georgian SSR. Her films were screened at the National Archives of Georgia. and at the Cannes Fllm Festival.

Family 
She married writer Revaz Tabukashvili.

She is buried in the Didube pantheon of writers and public figures.

Filmography 
 Giorgi Saakadze (1942)
 Keto and Kote (1948)
 The Color of Pomegranates (1969)
 Once Upon a Time There Was a Singing Blackbird (1970)
 Blue Mountains'' (1983)

References

External links

Medea Japaridze on Georgian National Filmography

1923 births
1994 deaths
20th-century actresses from Georgia (country)
People from Tbilisi
Sixth convocation members of the Supreme Soviet of the Soviet Union
Film actresses from Georgia (country)
Stage actresses from Georgia (country)
Stalin Prize winners
Recipients of the Order of the Red Banner of Labour
Recipients of the USSR State Prize
Burials at Didube Pantheon
Soviet actresses